Jarosławice may refer to the following places in Poland:
Jarosławice, Lower Silesian Voivodeship (south-west Poland)
Jarosławice, Świętokrzyskie Voivodeship (south-central Poland)
Jarosławice, Masovian Voivodeship (east-central Poland)